Somena exigua is a moth in the family Erebidae. It was described by John Nietner in 1861. It is found in Sri Lanka.

References

Moths described in 1861
Lymantriinae